Farida Group is one of the largest leather manufacturing companies in India based in Chennai. The Group has 13 factories spread across Asia, Africa and Europe It was founded by Abdul Majid Sahib in 1957 in Ambur.

Growth
The company has been rapidly expanding its presence all over North America and Europe by acquiring leather factories in US, UK, Germany and has recently entered the markets of Japan, China and South Korea. Future expansion plans in the Middle East, South America and China have pushed the company towards capitalizing on these regions.

References

Companies based in Chennai
1957 establishments in Madras State
Manufacturing companies established in 1957
Indian companies established in 1957